Emmanuel Okanlawon (born October 3, 2003), known professionally as YungManny, is an American rapper from Bowie, Maryland.

Career 
YungManny raps about many topics while using youth pop culture references, such as Hello Kitty, Moana, The Magic School Bus, and Stuart Little. In his music video for "Bonfire Pt. 2," he uses a power drill in place of a gun because he doesn't want to influence gun violence. He was introduced to Christianity by his young childhood friend Konya Nowlton. Alphonse Pierre of Pitchfork describes YungManny's music as falling within DMV rap while still incorporating his own style. Pierre further explains that YungManny's style uses "loud-mouthed aggression reminiscent of Prince George's County" similarly to Q Da Fool. HipHopDX reports that YungManny is "helping pave the way to a sound of rap that many were skeptical of not too long ago." Chris Richards of The Washington Post describes YungManny as "immeasurably inventive." YungManny's cousin Xanman is a frequent collaborator of his, with songs such as "First Day Out," "XanManny," and "Hop Out."

Discography

Albums 
 Confused (2020)
 OKANLAWON (2022)

Singles

References 

Living people
2003 births
21st-century American rappers
Rappers from Maryland
People from Prince George's County, Maryland
American male rappers
American child musicians
21st-century American male musicians
People from Bowie, Maryland